The 1985 NatWest Trophy was the 5th NatWest Trophy.  It was an English limited overs county cricket tournament which was held between 3 July and 7 September 1985. The tournament was won by Essex who defeated Nottinghamshire by 1 run in the final at Lord's.

Format
The seventeen first-class counties, were joined by thirteen Minor Counties: Bedfordshire, Berkshire, Buckinghamshire, Cheshire, Cumberland, Devon, Durham, Hertfordshire, Norfolk, Oxfordshire, Shropshire, Staffordshire and Suffolk.  The Ireland and Scotland teams also participated.  Teams who won in the first round progressed to the second round. The winners in the second round then progressed to the quarter-final stage.  Winners from the quarter-finals then progressed to the semi-finals from which the winners then went on to the final at Lord's which was held on 7 September 1985. Durham repeated their feat of 1973, in being a minor county defeating a first class county, when they saw off Derbyshire in round one.

First round

Second round

Quarter-finals

Semi-finals

Final

References

External links
CricketArchive tournament page 

Friends Provident Trophy seasons
Natwest Trophy, 1985
NatWest Group